Richard Thorpe (born 1 November 1984) is a retired Premiership, Championship and International rugby union player, and the current Director of Rugby for Chinnor Rugby Club in Thame, Oxfordshire. Richard played as a flanker or No. 8 for London Irish, Leicester Tigers and London Welsh in Premiership Rugby, and represented Canada at the 2015 Rugby World Cup in England. Born in Beckenham, England, he qualified to play internationally for  through his Canadian mother. He won 8 caps in 2014 and 2015 before retiring from professional rugby at the end of the 2016 season aged 31.

Career
Thorpe made his debut in an EDF Energy Cup match against London Wasps. He scored a hat-trick against the Newport Gwent Dragons, Thorpe was a member of the London Irish side that made the semi finals of the Heineken Cup that season.

Thorpe was a used replacement in the final of the 2008–09 Guinness Premiership.

Thorpe was selected for Canada, as he qualifies through his sensual mother, originally from Burlington outside Toronto, Canada. He made his international debut, as a replacement, losing to Samoa 13-23, as part of the 2014 Autumn Internationals.

Thorpe is now Director of Rugby at Chinnor R.F.C., currently in National League 1.

References

External links

1984 births
Living people
Alumni of St Mary's University, Twickenham
Canada international rugby union players
English rugby union players
Leicester Tigers players
London Irish players
People educated at Whitgift School
Rugby union players from Beckenham
Rugby union flankers